U.O.Me is the third single by the Dutch girl group Luv', released in early 1978 by Philips Records. It appears on the 1978 debut album, With Luv' and is considered as Luv's real breakthrough in Benelux. This record is also credited as U.O.Me (You Owe Me), U.O.Me (Welcome to Waldolala) or U.O.Me (Theme from Waldolala).

Background

Record producer Hans van Hemert was commissioned by VPRO channel to write the theme song for a TV series, Het is weer zo laat! (aka "Waldolala"). Assisted by Piet Souer, he composed "U.O.Me (Welcome To Waldolala)" which was recorded by Luv'. Het is weer zo laat! featured the female trio performing the theme song during the opening credits. 

U.O.Me was considered Luv's first real mainstream success. Its Disco-Carnival sound changed from the pop arrangements of the two previous singles (My Man and Dream, Dream). This track was inspired by A far l'amore comincia tu, the 1977 European hit performed by Raffaella Carrà.

Commercial performance

Because of Luv's exposure on the Waldolala TV show, the song became an instant hit in the Netherlands and Flanders and reached the singles Top 5 in both countries. It sold 150.000 copies in Benelux.

Track listing and release

7" Vinyl 

 a. "U.O.Me"
 b. "Hang On"

Cover versions
 Studio formation Conquistador (also produced by Hans van Hemert and Piet Souer) recorded an instrumental version of this song.
 Schlager singer Peter Petrel recorded a German cover version entitled "Wer Hat Hier Denn Wohl Wen Verführt" in 1978.
 De Strangers recorded a parody in Dutch entitled "'t Sauna Bad" in 1978.
 Finnish girl group Mirumaru performed the track as "Sun Vain Oon" in their language in 1978.
 Dutch act De Vedettes recorded their version of Luv's breakthrough hit to support the Netherlands national football team (the Oranjes) at the 2010 FIFA World Cup. This cover was entitled "Oh! Wat Een Mooie Goal!" (Oh! What a beautiful goal!) and peaked at #39 on the Netherlands' Single Top 100 in July 2010.
 In 2015, Pop singer Tamara Tol released a Dutch language cover version entitled "Dan Gaan We Dansen". The track reached #23 on Oranje Top 30 (a Gfk chart of the 30 most popular Dutch-speaking productions). 
 In 2016, Dutch rapper Def Rhymz & Ronnie Ruysdael covered the legendary pop song and named it "Fawaka".
 In January 2018, the TV commercial for breakfast cereals "Granooolala" featured three ladies dressed in 1970s outfits (with Charlie's Angels-like wigs) and lip-syncing to a new version of "U.O.Me".

Charts

Weekly charts

Year-end charts

References

1978 singles
Disco songs
Luv' songs
Songs written by Hans van Hemert
Songs written by Piet Souer
1977 songs
Philips Records singles
Phonogram Records singles